Nello Santin (born 3 July 1946) is an Italian former professional footballer, who played as a defender, and former football manager. He made 274 appearances in Serie A, most notably for Milan, Sampdoria and Torino, during the 1960s and 1970s.

Honours

Club 
A.C. Milan
Serie A: 1967–68
Coppa Italia: 1966–67
European Cup: 1968–69
Cup Winners' Cup: 1967–68
Intercontinental Cup: 1969
Torino
Serie A: 1975–76

External links 
Profile at MagliaRossonera.it 
Profile at EmozioneCalcio.it 

1946 births
Living people
Italian footballers
Serie A players
Serie B players
Association football defenders
A.C. Milan players
L.R. Vicenza players
U.C. Sampdoria players
Torino F.C. players
Italian football managers
U.S. Pistoiese 1921 managers
A.C. Reggiana 1919 managers
S.P.A.L. managers
Alma Juventus Fano 1906 managers
A.S.D. Civitavecchia 1920 managers